Kimberly A. Hughes is an American biologist. Hughes completed her doctoral studies at the University of Chicago in 1993. She is a professor of biological science at Florida State University. In 2018, Hughes was elected a fellow of the American Association for the Advancement of Science.

References

Living people
Year of birth missing (living people)
American women biologists
University of Chicago alumni
Florida State University faculty
20th-century American biologists
21st-century American biologists
Fellows of the American Association for the Advancement of Science
American women academics
20th-century American women scientists
21st-century American women scientists